Sphecosesia is a genus of moths in the family Sesiidae.

Species
Sphecosesia ashinaga Kallies & Arita, 2004
Sphecosesia aterea Hampson, 1919
Sphecosesia bruneiensis Kallies, 2003
Sphecosesia pedunculata Hampson, 1910
Sphecosesia rhodites Kallies & Arita, 2004

References

Sesiidae